(Dates in italics indicate de facto continuation of office)

Political Affiliation
DTA - Democratic Turnhalle Alliance

See also

Bantustans in South West Africa
Apartheid
Presidents of Namibia
Prime Ministers of Namibia

Apartheid in South West Africa
Bantustans in South West Africa
Kavango people